Václav Chudomel (27 September 1932 – 15 December 2016) was a Czech long-distance runner. He competed in the marathon at the 1964 Summer Olympics and finished in 18th place. He won the Košice Peace Marathon in 1969.

References

1932 births
2016 deaths
Czech male long-distance runners
Olympic athletes of Czechoslovakia
Athletes (track and field) at the 1964 Summer Olympics